Vladimir Muravyov may refer to:

Vladimir Muravyov (athlete) (born 1959), former Soviet track and field athlete
Vladimir Sergeyevich Muravyov (1939–2001), Russian translator and literary critic
 (1861–1940), Russian painter and count
Vladimir Aleksandrovich Muravyov (1938–2020), Soviet and Russian military officer